Chester's Dee Radio (Previously Dee 106.3 and Dee on DAB) is an Independent Local Radio station serving the city of Chester and a wide surrounding area. The station is wholly owned and broadcasts from studios at Riverside Innovation Center, previously from Chantry Court in Chester. FM output is sent from the studios via Microwave transmission to the FM transmitter located atop the Steam Mill building in Chester city centre. Dee Radio also broadcasts on DAB across West Cheshire, North Wales and Merseyside using multiplexes based at Moel-y-Parc transmitting station and Radio City Tower in Liverpool.

In January 2020 the station was re-branded as "The all new Chester's Dee Radio"

In older news, June 2009 saw the purchase of neighbouring local station 106.9 Silk FM in Macclesfield. Now Cheshire's Silk 106.9

As of December 2022, the station broadcasts to a weekly audience of 20,000, according to RAJAR.

Programming
All of Dee Radio's programming is produced and broadcast from its Chester studios. Live programming airs from 6am to 7pm during weekdays, 8am to 6pm on Saturdays and 10am to 2pm on Sundays. Other output is voice tracked or automated.

The station's presenters include Gavin Matthews, Dave Phillips, Steve Lord, Ruth Anne Pollard, Darren Antrobus and Shane Pinnington.

News and sport
Dee Radio broadcasts hourly local news bulletins produced by Radio News Hub from 6am-6pm on weekdays and 10am-2pm at weekends. National bulletins from Sky News Radio are carried every hour at all other times.

The station also airs weekly sports programming on Friday evenings and Saturday afternoons, including regular coverage of Chester FC.

References

External links
Dee 106.3
Dee on DAB

Chester
Dee
Radio stations established in 2003